Pavlovka hydroelectric station is a power station located near the village Pavlovka on the Ufa River in Bashkortostan.  Construction of the power station began in 1950 and was completed in 1960.  The power station is owned and operated by Bashkirenergo.

Description
The power station consists of:
 Single-chamber navigation lock - spillway;
 Offtake

The power station has a capacity of 166.4 MW and the average annual generation of 590 GWh. It has four Kaplan turbines with capacity of 41.6 MW each. Turbines are manufactured by Kharkov Turboatom and generators are manufactured by the St. Petersburg plant Electrosila.

Modernization
The power station is in process of modernization. As a result, the capacity of each turbine will increase to 50.4 MW, and the total capacity will be 201.6 MW.

References

External links
"Kaplan Turbines - Renewables First"

Hydroelectric power stations built in the Soviet Union
Hydroelectric power stations in Russia
Dams in Russia
Buildings and structures in Bashkortostan
Dams completed in 1961